Forrest Pritchard (born June 1, 1974) is a New York Times bestselling author and seventh-generation sustainable farmer, living at Smithfield Farm in Berryville, Virginia, United States. He is a graduate of Episcopal High School and The College of William and Mary, where he won the Academy of American Poets prize in 1996. His farm, called Smith Meadows, was one of the first "grass-finished" farms in the country, and sells at farmers' markets in the Washington, D.C. area. His books include the New York Times bestseller Gaining Ground, A Story of Farmers' Markets, Local Food and Saving the Family Farm (Lyons, 2013, no. 19 in E-books non-fiction) named a top read by NPR and Publishers Weekly, and Growing Tomorrow: Behind The Scenes With 18 Sustainable Farmers Who Are Changing The Way We Eat (with Molly Peterson, The Experiment, 2015  ).

Works 

 Gaining Ground: A Story of Farmers' Markets, Local Food, and Saving the Family Farm (2013). 
 Growing Tomorrow: A Farm-to-Table Journey in Photos and Recipes: Behind the Scenes with 18 Extraordinary Sustainable Farmers Who Are Changing the Way We Eat (2015). 
 Start Your Farm: The Authoritative Guide to Becoming a Sustainable 21st Century Farmer (2018).

References 

1974 births
Living people
American male writers
College of William & Mary alumni
Sustainable agriculture